The Fatih Sultan Mehmet Bridge ("Sultan Mehmed the Conqueror Bridge"), also known as the Second Bosphorus Bridge (in Turkish: Fatih Sultan Mehmet Köprüsü, F.S.M. Köprüsü or 2. Köprü), is a bridge in Istanbul, Turkey spanning the Bosphorus strait (Turkish: Boğaziçi). When completed in 1988, it was the 5th-longest suspension bridge span in the world.

The bridge is named after the 15th-century Ottoman Sultan Mehmed the Conqueror, who conquered the Byzantine capital, Constantinople (Istanbul), in 1453. It carries the European route E80, Asian Highway 1, Asian Highway 5 and Otoyol 2 highways.
There are three other bridges that connect Europe and Asia located in Turkey which are named Yavuz Sultan Selim Bridge, 15 July Martyrs Bridge (formerly known as Bosphorus Bridge)and 1915 Çanakkale Bridge.

Location
The bridge is situated between İstanbul Hisarüstü (European side) and Kavacık (Asian side). It is a gravity-anchored suspension bridge with steel pylons and vertical hangers. The aerodynamic deck hangs on double vertical steel cables. It is 1,510 m long with a deck width of 39 m. The distance between the towers (main span) is 1,090 m and their height over road level is 105 m. The clearance of the bridge from sea level is 64 m.

Construction
The bridge was designed by Freeman Fox & Partners and BOTEK Bosphorus Technical Consulting Corp., who had previously designed the Bosphorus Bridge. An international consortium of three Japanese companies (including IHI Corporation and Mitsubishi Heavy Industries), one Italian (Impregilo) and one Turkish company (STFA) carried out the construction works. The bridge was completed on July 3, 1988 and opened by Prime Minister Turgut Özal, who drove his official car, becoming the first to cross. The cost of the bridge amounted to US$130 million.

Transportation
The bridge is on the Trans-European Motorway between Edirne and Ankara. The highway bridge has four lanes for vehicular traffic plus one emergency lane in each direction. On weekday mornings, commuter traffic flows mostly westbound to the European part, so five of the eight lanes run westbound and only three eastbound. Conversely, on weekday evenings, five lanes are dedicated to eastbound traffic and three lanes, to westbound traffic. Pedestrians are not allowed to use the bridge. Currently, around 150,000 vehicles pass daily in both directions; almost 70% are automobiles.

Toll collection
Fatih Sultan Mehmet is a toll bridge, but payment is required only from vehicles travelling to Asia (as in the First Bosphorus Bridge, no payment is required while passing from Asia to Europe.) Since April 2008, cash payments are no longer accepted, having been replaced by a remote payment system. In addition to OGS, the contactless smart sticker HGS system is in use.

An OGS device or HGS sticker can be obtained at various stations before the toll plaza of highways and bridges.

Since late 2019 the toll is 10.50 TRY (currently about 1.40 USD).

The tolls for Istanbul bridges increase every 20 months or so by tens of percent to keep up with high inflation.

See also
 Çanakkale 1915 Bridge
 Eurasia Tunnel, undersea tunnel, crossing the Bosphorus for vehicular traffic, opened in December 2016.
 Great Istanbul Tunnel, a proposed three-level road-rail undersea tunnel.
 Osman Gazi Bridge
 Marmaray, undersea rail tunnel connecting the Asian and European sides of Istanbul.
 Public transport in Istanbul
 Rail transport in Turkey
 Turkish Straits

References

 Design and Construction Stages of Fatih Sultan Mehmed Bridge, ITU

External links
 
 
 Google aerial image of bridge
 3D-model ″Fatih Sultan Mehmet Bridge″ for Google Earth 

Bosphorus crossings
Bridges completed in 1988
Bridges in Istanbul
Mehmed the Conqueror
Road bridges in Turkey
Suspension bridges in Turkey
Toll bridges in Turkey
1988 establishments in Turkey